Founded in 1983, AIDS Vancouver (AV) is a non-profit and community-based health organization whose mission is to alleviate collective vulnerability to HIV and AIDS through support, public education and community-based research. The organization exists to both ameliorate the life of persons living with HIV and AIDS, and to prevent the spread of HIV by educational initiatives. Based in Vancouver, it is Canada's oldest and Vancouver's largest HIV and AIDS service organization.

AIDS Vancouver opened its doors in 1983 as one of the first AIDS service organizations in Canada in response to the growing need for community health organizations to support individuals vulnerable to the epidemic.

Background
Of the 37.7 million people with HIV worldwide, more than 60,000 reside in Canada. British Columbia has a disproportionately high prevalence rate of HIV for Canada, with over a fifth of the HIV positive population found in BC. Increases in the prevalence of HIV in Vancouver can be attributed to high incidence among Men who have sex with Men (MSM) and Injection Drug Users (IDU), which occurred in the 1980s and 1990s, respectively.

AIDS Vancouver was created in 1983 to support those persons diagnosed with HIV (at the time referred to as Gay-Related Immune Deficiency), and to create a community with no new HIV infections. By providing free services to those living with HIV and educating people about HIV, AIDS Vancouver is helping lower the incidence of the disease.

History
AIDS Vancouver was founded in 1983 with the goal of information dissemination, when there were only six known cases of AIDS in Vancouver. Initially, the organization's efforts were concentrated towards producing posters, newsletters and brochures in an awareness campaign. The organization was first based out of the founders' homes with monthly public meetings being held at the Lotus Hotel. Then in 1984, AIDS Vancouver moved to a Davie St. location and established an Emergency Assistance Fund for persons with AIDS, with the help of government funding. 

By 1998, AIDS Vancouver reached a new milestone, with nearly 16,000 clients served, and the helpline receiving 1600 calls. In 2001, AIDS Vancouver partnered with the Mexican Persons With AIDS Society, to exchange assistance, ideas and advocacy. The Case Management model was updated to its current form – the access and intensive streams.

Today, the agency has 25 paid staff and 200 volunteers providing health promotion, education, and support services. Services include case management grocery program, resource centre, helpline and support programs.

Funding and Volunteerism
The services provided by AIDS Vancouver rely on both paid staff and 200 volunteers. Volunteers donate 20,000 person-hours each year, amounting to roughly $400,000 worth of work.

Currently, 80% of funding comes from federal and provincial sources. Donors supply an additional 12% of the funds, with the remaining 8% coming from fund development activities. Notable funders include the Vancouver Coastal Health Authority, Public Health Agency of Canada and the BC Gaming Commission.

In 2009, they partnered with U.S. nonprofit TeachAids to provide state-of-the-art educational materials developed at Stanford University to their constituent groups.

Client Services
Client services are central to AIDS Vancouver's work. Over 146 new clients were added in 2009 and made use of numerous different services such as Case Management, Grocery and Nutritional Advice and the Helpline. In 2014, a new service was added - the Health Promotion Case Management (HPCM) - which is focused on prevention of new cases of HIV.

Case Management
The Case management team consists of 10 staff working out of four sites, to provide support to over 2000 clients living with HIV and linking them to appropriate levels of health care and social services. Sites are located in the Seymour St. office and in the Downtown East side, which cater specifically to the Aboriginal community and gay men. Most commonly, support is provided with income, housing or financial assistance. The case management program consists of two streams – the access (short term or drop-in) and intensive (long term) streams. Roughly 150 new clients are added each year from all demographics – First Nations, women, men, children, and others.

Community Resource Centre
The Community Resource Centre provides information about HIV and AIDS. Computers can be used by anyone to get more information on the Internet. Materials from the resource centre can also be ordered, to help in sharing knowledge.

Grocery
In 2009 the AIDS Vancouver grocery program supplied roughly 16,000 bags of grocery to roughly 700 clients, working with 16 volunteers. The program offers a variety of supplemental nutrition items, such as fresh produce, cereals and grains, canned protein and hygiene items, in addition to bottled water. The grocery is open twice a week, for two weeks a month.

Help Line
The helpline and reception service provided anonymous and confidential information to over 11,000 inquiries in 2009 via walk-in, email, forums and telephone. Trained volunteers can answer queries pertaining to testing, safer sex, treatment and transmission of HIV.

Health Promotion Case Management (HPCM)
The HPCM program uses a comprehensive approach to health which positions HIV prevention within a broad and inclusive health framework. This program offers clients the opportunity to connect with a professional that can help them address the barriers that can impact their health and well-being.

Special Events
AIDS Vancouver participates in the Scotiabank AIDS Walk for Life, the We Care Red Ribbon Campaign and World AIDS Day. On September 27, AIDS Vancouver held the popular Celebrity Dim Sum fund-raiser. The seventh annual event garnered an unprecedented $21,670, surpassing its 2013 goal by almost $3500. Every year, AIDS Vancouver hosts the Holiday Grocery which happens in December, providing festive groceries for up to 800 people in one day.

Governance
AIDS Vancouver, incorporated as the Vancouver AIDS Society, is a non-profit (cannot generate money) volunteer-led organization guided by the Society's 12-member Board of Directors. The Board ensures responsible policy development and meeting the mission statement and strategic direction. Four positions on the Board are reserved for those persons living with HIV. The 25 paid staff are led by an Executive Director who reports to and works closely with the Board.

AIDS Vancouver members participate by electing the board of directors at the society's Annual General Meeting and by participating occasionally in committees established by the Board.

Prevention & Education
The HIV Prevention & Awareness Programs aim to educate communities in the fight against HIV/AIDS, and to overcome stigma and stereotyping. The organization views information and knowledge as keys toward understanding and acceptance of HIV and AIDS. Workshops are offered by AIDS Vancouver's Prevention and Awareness Program to educate and give out trusted and accurate materials. AIDS Vancouver aims to provide a professional and interactive learning environment for its clients.

See also
 HIV
 AIDS

References

HIV/AIDS organizations
Organizations based in Vancouver
HIV/AIDS activism
Medical and health organizations based in British Columbia